Patrick Mumbure Mutume (October 31, 1943 – February 8, 2017) was a Roman Catholic bishop.

Ordained to the priesthood in 1972, Mutume served as auxiliary bishop of the Roman Catholic Diocese of Mutare, Zimbabwe, from 1979 until his death.

Notes

1943 births
2017 deaths
Rhodesian Roman Catholic bishops
20th-century Roman Catholic bishops in Zimbabwe
21st-century Roman Catholic bishops in Zimbabwe
Roman Catholic bishops of Mutare